Tenthredinini are a tribe of sawflies (Hymenoptera), including the family genus Tenthredo.

Genera include:

 Ischyroceraea Kiaer 1898
 Lagium Konow 1904
 Rhogogaster Konow 1884
 Tenthredo Linnaeus, 1758

References

Bibliography 

 
 
 
 , in

External links 
 BugGuide:Tribe Tenthredinini

Tenthredinidae
Hymenoptera tribes